Shaharut (– šaḥarūt) is a community settlement in the far south of Israel. Located 40 kilometers north of Eilat, and six kilometers west of Yotvata on a ridge above the Arabah valley, it falls under the jurisdiction of Hevel Eilot Regional Council.

History
The village was founded in 1985 by the Jewish Agency and was named after the nearby Shaharut Mountain; the word "Shaharut" means "youth", as in Ecclesiastes chapter 11. It is the only settlement in the area that is not in the valley.

Notable residents 

 A-WA

References

Community settlements
Populated places in Southern District (Israel)
Populated places established in 1985
1985 establishments in Israel